Thug Pound is a collaborative studio album by Bizzy Bone and Bad Azz, released on September 1, 2009 on Hi Power Entertainment.

Track listing
"Intro"
"Outside My Window"
"Through My Telescope" (Produced by NuNation Productions)
"Living Our Lives" (feat. Conflict)
"Champion Club" (Produced by NuNation Productions)
"Touch The Sky" (Produced by NuNation Productions)
"Daily Bread"
"When Will We" (Produced by NuNation Productions)
"Slo-Fo"
"Hop In My Space Ship" (Produced by NuNation Productions)
"Get Your Gun On"
"All Over The World" (Produced by NuNation Productions)
"Outro"

References

2009 albums
Bizzy Bone albums
Bad Azz (rapper) albums